Niels-Ulrik Bugge (born 29 July 1943) is a Danish politician. He is a member of the Venstre party. From 2006 to 2010 he was the mayor of Odder Municipality. He has a background as a lawyer.

References 

1943 births
Living people
Danish municipal councillors
Mayors of places in Denmark
People from Vejle Municipality
Venstre (Denmark) politicians